István Sándor (8 June 1921 – 5 January 2018) was a Hungarian rower. He competed in the men's eight event at the 1952 Summer Olympics.

Sándor had been picked to represent Hungary at the 1948 Olympics, but was dropped for suspected anti-Communist activities. He later emigrated to the United States and then Canada, where he died.

References

External links
 

1921 births
2018 deaths
Hungarian male rowers
Olympic rowers of Hungary
Rowers at the 1952 Summer Olympics
Rowers from Budapest